Raymond Keith Rochow  (14 March 1934 – 8 December 2014) was an Australian rules footballer who played with Fitzroy in the Victorian Football League (VFL). 

Keith's brother Phil Rochow also played with Fitzroy during the 1957 VFL season.

In 2014, Keith Rochow was awarded a Medal of the Order of Australia (OAM) for his extended "service to the community through sporting, child and aged care organisations."

Notes

External links 

		
2014 deaths
1934 births
Australian rules footballers from Victoria (Australia)		
Fitzroy Football Club players
Recipients of the Medal of the Order of Australia